Marcin Rempała (born 20 November 1984 in Tarnów, Poland) is a Polish speedway rider who won Team Under 21 World Championship in 2005.

His older brothers, Jacek Rempała, Grzegorz Rempała and Tomasz Rempała were also speedway riders.

Career details

World Championships 
 Team World Championship (Speedway World Cup)
 2004 -  Poole - 4th place (7 points)
 Individual World U-21 Championship
 2005 -  Wiener Neustadt - 5th place (6 points)
 Team U-21 World Championship (Under-21 World Cup)
 2005 -  Pardubice - World Champion (8 points)

European Championships 
 Individual European Championship
 2004 -  Holsted - 17th place (1 points as track reserve)
 European Pairs Championship
 2006 -  Lendava - European Champion (track reserve in Final)
 European Under-19 Championship
 2003 -  Pocking - 5th place (9 points)

Domestic competitions 
 Individual Polish Championship
 2009 - 11th place in Quarter-Final 1
 Silver Helmet (U-21)
 2005 - 3rd place

See also 
Poland national speedway team

References

1984 births
Living people
Polish speedway riders
Team Speedway Junior World Champions
European Pairs Speedway Champions
Ipswich Witches riders
Sportspeople from Tarnów